Effector cell peptidase receptor 1, also known as EPR1, is a human gene.

This locus represents an antisense transcript of the survivin locus. This record was withdrawn in collaboration with HGNC. It was defined by L26245.1, which appears to be a cloning artifact.(This information come from https://www.ncbi.nlm.nih.gov/gene?term=L26245.1)

References

Further reading

Genes